Mandelman is a surname and may refer to:

People
 Avner Mandelman, Israeli-Canadian businessman and writer 
 Beatrice Mandelman (1912–1998), American abstract artist
 Jack A. Mandelman, American on the List of prolific inventors
 Rafael Mandelman, member of the San Francisco Board of Supervisors

Other
 Mandelman-Ribak Foundation, a nonprofit dedicated to the work of Beatrice Mandelman and Louis Leon Ribak